Below is a list of ships responsible for bombarding targets at Sword as part of the Normandy landings on 6 June 1944, the opening day of Operation Overlord, the Allied operation that launched the successful invasion of German-occupied western Europe during World War II.

References
 

Sword Bombardment Group
Sword Bombardment Group
Sword Bombardment Group